Van Rompuy is a Flemish family name derived from [van] ruim pad which means "[of/from] wide path". It may refer to:

People
Eric Van Rompuy (born 1949), Flemish politician
Herman Van Rompuy (born 1947), Belgian Prime minister, President of the Council of the European Union
Peter Van Rompuy (born 1980), Belgian senator

Politics
Van Rompuy Government, federal government of Belgium formed on December 30, 2008

References

Surnames of Dutch origin